Main Julian England is a 2007 Pothwari comedy telefilm. Main Julian England (which means "I'm going to England") is a sequel to the successful Miki Kharo England which was the first ever Pothwari comedy telefilm. It has a popular song performed by Aftab which became a cult classic and a phenomenon

Plot 
Main Julian England is about a man named Aftab (Iftikhar Thakur), who is marrying a woman from England and plans to stay there. It is a sequel to the 2006 telefilm (Miki Kharo England) in which Aftab is rejected by his cousin Tina who wants to marry one of his friends Shahid "Shedu" (Anjum Malik) instead. Following her rejection, Aftab's aunt (Tina's mother) promises to Aftab and his mother that she will get him married to someone in England, and so Main Julian England shows "Shedu" and Tina's marriage and Aftab marrying a woman living in England, and another friend of theirs, Mithu (Shahzada Ghaffar), also getting married and planning to move to England. Great comedy brews as the three childhood friends begin planning their move to England.

Popularity 

Miki Kharo England and Main Julian England were both first aired by DM Digital, and although DM Digital didn't show much of the movie and instead took it as an opportunity to make money as a result of taking live calls, most of which were people complaining about the amount of the drama being shown, the telefilm was very popular and successful amongst the Pothwari/Mirpuri community. It is also rumoured that there will be a third sequel after the success of the first two, but these rumours are still unconfirmed.

Cast 
 Iftikhar Thakur ... Aftab (Sain)
 Shahzada Ghaffar ... Mithu
 Hameed Babar ... Chacha Khabri
 Anjum Malik ... Shahid (Shedu)
 Shagufta Qureshi ... Tina
 Rukhsana Khan ... Musarato (Aftab's sister)
 Baitan Farooqi ... Meeru (Mithus father)
 Ghazala Butt ... "Azra Ni Khala" (Tina's mother) (Lubna-Ghazal Butt)
 Ifut Chaudhry ... Zubeda (Aftab's mother)
 Shabbir Mirza ... Aftab's father

Pakistani comedy films
2007 television films
2007 films
2007 comedy films
Pakistani television films
Potwari-language films